Haystacks: Autumn is a  painting by French artist Jean-François Millet. Done in oil on canvas, the work depicts a group of haystacks in a French field. The painting is one of a series of four paintings, one for each season, that Millet painted on commission for a French industrialist. The work is in the collection of the Metropolitan Museum of Art, in New York.

References

Paintings in the collection of the Metropolitan Museum of Art
Paintings by Jean-François Millet
1874 paintings
Sheep in art
Farming in art